Wehrlite is an ultramafic and ultrabasic rock that is a mixture of olivine and clinopyroxene. It is a subdivision of the peridotites.

The nomenclature allows up to a few percent of orthopyroxene. Accessory minerals include ilmenite, chromite, magnetite and an aluminium-bearing mineral (plagioclase, spinel or garnet).

Wehrlites occur as mantle xenoliths and in ophiolites. Another occurrence is as cumulate in gabbro and norite layered intrusions. Some meteorites can also be classified as wehrlites (e.g. NWA 4797).

Wehrlite is named after Alois Wehrle. He was born 1791 in Kroměříž, Czech Republic (then Kremsier in Mähren) and was a professor at the "Ungarische Bergakademie" (Hungarian Mining School) in Banská Štiavnica, Slovakia (then Schemnitz, Kingdom of Hungary).

References

Ultramafic rocks